Heliocheilus flavitincta is a moth in the family Noctuidae. It is endemic to the Northern Territory and Western Australia.

External links
Australian Faunal Directory

Heliocheilus
Moths of Australia